Workers' Weekly may refer to:

 Workers' Weekly (UK), the organ of the Communist Party of Great Britain 1923–1927, replaced by Daily Worker
Workers' Weekly (Australia), the organ of the Communist Party of Australia 1923–1939, replaced by Tribune